Theodore Roosevelt Dalton (July 3, 1901 – October 30, 1989) was a Virginia attorney and a United States district judge of the United States District Court for the Western District of Virginia. He was known as Virginia's "Mr. Republican."

Education and career

Born on July 3, 1901, in Carroll County, Virginia, Dalton received an Artium Baccalaureus degree in 1924 from the College of William & Mary and a Bachelor of Laws in 1926 from William & Mary Law School. He entered private practice in Radford, Virginia from 1926 to 1959. His law partners included Richard Harding Poff, and in later years both Poff and Dalton were mentioned as potential nominees to the Supreme Court of the United States. Dalton also worked with James Clinton Turk, who like Dalton later became a federal judge. He was Commonwealth's Attorney in Radford from 1928 to 1936. He was a member of the Senate of Virginia from 1944 to 1959.

Political career

Dalton won his first Virginia Senate election as a write-in candidate in 1944, and became the leading Republican in Virginia during his 15 years a member of the Senate of Virginia. Senator Dalton ran unsuccessfully as the Republican candidate for Governor of Virginia in 1953 and 1957, in opposition to the fading but still dominant Democratic Byrd Organization led by United States Senator Harry F. Byrd. Both times Dalton proposed to abolish the poll tax. Dalton's first campaign was the high point of what appeared to be a new era for the Republican Party in Virginia. In the federal elections of 1952, three Virginia Republicans including Dalton's old law partner Poff were elected to Congress, and Dwight D. Eisenhower carried Virginia in the presidential election. In 1953, against Democrat Thomas Bahnson Stanley and Independent Howard Carwile, Dalton garnered 45% of the vote. His running mates in that election were both lawyers: Stephen Timberlake of Staunton as the candidate for lieutenant governor and Walter Edward Hoffman of Norfolk (another future federal judge) for Attorney General. Public finance for transportation proved a crucial issue, as Senator Byrd took back his promise to his friend Dalton not to intervene, after Dalton proposed road bonds at odds with Byrd's doctrine of "pay as you go."

School desegregation seemed the major issue in the 1957 election (in the wake of the 1954 and 1955 decisions in Brown v. Board of Education), and Dalton lost badly to Democrat J. Lindsay Almond By 1956, Byrd Democrats including Almond had responded with "Massive Resistance", vowing to close schools to avoid integration. Passage of the Civil Rights Act of 1957 and efforts by the federal government to enforce desegregation in Little Rock Central High School were used against Republicans, and led to the widened margin of defeat for Dalton in his second statewide campaign. Dalton had criticized the Brown decisions, and proposed a pupil placement plan that would allow most schools to remain segregated "for maybe a hundred years." He also wrote to President Eisenhower, urging withdrawal of the troops from Little Rock, Arkansas. Nonetheless, Dalton managed just 36.5% of the vote. When Senator Byrd announced retirement plans in 1958, Senator Dalton cast the only vote in the General Assembly against a resolution urging Byrd to run again, which Byrd did.

Governor Mills E. Godwin Jr. selected Dalton to serve on the Virginia Commission for Constitutional Revision, the efforts of which led to the Virginia Constitution of 1971. Lewis F. Powell Jr., Oliver Hill, former governors Albertis Harrison and Colgate Darden also served on that commission.

Federal judicial service

Dalton was nominated by President Dwight D. Eisenhower on July 21, 1959, to a seat on the United States District Court for the Western District of Virginia vacated by Judge John Paul Jr. He was confirmed by the United States Senate on August 12, 1959, and received his commission on August 13, 1959. He served as Chief Judge from 1960 to 1971. He assumed senior status on October 12, 1976. President Gerald Ford nominated Glen Morgan Williams as Dalton's successor, after Senator William L. Scott derailed the nomination of the President's first choice. Dalton's service terminated on October 30, 1989, due to his death in Radford.

Notable cases

Along with his colleagues, Dalton as federal judge presided over litigation that continued into the 1970s to implement the Brown decision in Virginia's public schools. Dalton ordered the desegregation plan for the public schools in Roanoke, Virginia, which ultimately led to the conversion of the Lucy Addison High School (for African Americans) into a desegregated middle school.

Dalton served on the three-judge panel in a case rejecting a constitutional challenge to Virginia's method of distributing state money for education to the various school districts across the state.

Family

Dalton was born in Carroll County, Virginia to parents Currell Dalton  (November 4, 1866 – November 29, 1919) and Loduska Vernon Martin (December 10, 1869 – 1920). His wife, Mary Turner, died September 1988. Dalton's grandmother Clarissa Goad Dalton (August 18, 1841 – February 28, 1907) was related to Dexter Goad (November 5, 1867 – July 1, 1939), the Republican clerk of court in Carroll County at the time of the courthouse shootings following the conviction of Floyd Allen in March 1912. Dalton's nephew, John Nichols Dalton, whom he had adopted as his son, was elected as a Republican as Governor of Virginia in 1977. Their next-door neighbor in Radford was Charlotte Giesen, who became the first Republican woman elected to the House of Delegates in 1957.

Honors

In 1968, Dalton was selected as an honorary member of the Order of the Coif of the law school of Washington and Lee University. Dalton also received an honorary doctorate of laws degree from the College of William & Mary in 1972.

Death and legacy

Dalton died at Radford Community Hospital of complications from pneumonia. He outlived his son, John Dalton, by some three years. Dalton's former law clerks included Glen E. Conrad, who in 2003 succeeded United States District Judge Glen Williams on the United States District Court for the Western District of Virginia, but whose nomination to the United States Court of Appeals for the Fourth Circuit lapsed at the end of the term of President George W. Bush.

Dalton's personal papers are held by the Special Collections Research Center at the College of William & Mary.

References

External links
  Ted Dalton, 88, Dies; Retired Federal Judge, New York Times obituary, November 2, 1989
 Theodore Roosevelt Dalton – Brief biography on Television News of the Civil Rights Era website
 
 College of William & Mary, Swem Library, Inventory of the Ted Dalton Papers 1933–1978, 1952–1959
 
 

1901 births
1989 deaths
College of William & Mary alumni
County and city Commonwealth's Attorneys in Virginia
Republican Party Virginia state senators
Judges of the United States District Court for the Western District of Virginia
United States district court judges appointed by Dwight D. Eisenhower
20th-century American judges
William & Mary Law School alumni
People from Carroll County, Virginia
People from Radford, Virginia
20th-century American politicians